The Pacific Remote Islands Marine National Monument is a group of unorganized, mostly unincorporated United States Pacific Island territories managed by the United States Fish and Wildlife Service of the United States Department of the Interior and the National Oceanic and Atmospheric Administration (NOAA) of the United States Department of Commerce. These remote refuges are "the most widespread collection of marine- and terrestrial-life protected areas on the planet under a single country's jurisdiction". They protect many endemic species including corals, fish, shellfish, marine mammals, seabirds, water birds, land birds, insects, and vegetation not found elsewhere.

History
The Pacific Remote Islands Marine National Monument was proclaimed a national monument on January 6, 2009, by U.S. President George W. Bush and follows his June 6, 2006, creation of the Papahānaumokuākea Marine National Monument in the Northwestern Hawaiian Islands. It was expanded on September 25, 2014 by U.S. President Barack Obama. For Baker Island, Howland Island, Kingman Reef, and Palmyra Atoll, fishery-related activities seaward from the  refuge boundaries out to the  MNM boundary (about  square across) are managed by NOAA. For Jarvis Island, Johnston Atoll, and Wake Island, fishery-related activities seaward from the  refuge boundaries out to the  MNM boundary (U.S. EEZ waters) are managed by NOAA. The entire monument is closed to commercial fishing and other resource extraction activities, such as deep sea mining.

The monument includes endemic trees, grasses, and birds adapted to life at the equator; the rare sea turtles and whales and Hawaiian monk seals that visit Johnston Atoll; and high-quality coral reefs. U.S. federal law prohibits resource destruction or extraction, waste dumping, and commercial fishing in the monument areas. Research, free passage, and recreation are allowed.

Sport fishing is exempt and public comments were solicited. He then signed a proclamation on September 25, 2014, expanding the monument to six times its original size, resulting in 490,343 square miles (1,269,982 square kilometers) of protected area around these tropical islands and atolls in the south-central Pacific Ocean. Expanding the monument protected the deep coral reefs, seamounts, and marine ecosystems unique to this part of the world, which are also among the most vulnerable areas to the impacts of climate change and ocean acidification. Specifically, it expanded the boundaries to the 200 nautical-mile, outer limit of the U.S. EEZ around Wake Island, Johnston Atoll, and Jarvis Island, while leaving in place the 50 nautical-mile boundaries for Kingman Reef and Palmyra Atoll and Howland and Baker Islands created by the 2009 proclamation.

In September 2017, Trump Administration U.S. Interior Secretary Ryan Zinke recommended that the boundaries of the monument be reduced by an unspecified amount. By the end of his term in office, in January 2021, former President Trump had not followed this recommendation.

Geography

Location and area
The following islands form the basis of the Pacific Remote Islands Marine National Monument:
The atoll has a total area of 129 km2, of which 2.1 km2 is land and 127 km2 is water.
The island has a total area of 139 km2, of which 2.6 km2 is land and 136 km2 is water. 
The island has a total area of 152 km2, of which 5 km2 is land and 147 km2 is water.
The atoll has a total area of 276.6 km2, of which 2.6 km2 is land and 274 km2 is water.
The reef has a total area of 1,958.01 km2, of which 0.01 km2 is land and 1,958 km2 is water.
The atoll has a total area of 1,949 km2, of which 3.9 km2 is land and 1,946 km2 is water.
The atoll has a total area of 13.86 km2, of which 7.38 km2 is land and 6.48 km2 is water.

Climate

Because the islands are scattered throughout the ocean, the climate is different on each island. Baker, Howland, and Jarvis Islands have an equatorial climate, with scant rainfall, constant wind, and burning sun. Johnston Atoll and Kingman Reef have a tropical climate, but are generally dry, with consistent northeast trade winds with little seasonal temperature variation. Palmyra Atoll has a hot, equatorial climate.

Effects of climate change 
A recent study in the journal Climatic Change, suggests the expanded reserve could make pelagic fish populations in the Pacific more resilient to ocean warming. Researchers found that by 2060, warmer temperatures will attract skipjack tuna from the Western Pacific to the protected waters of the Monument, away from areas that are heavily fished.

Population 
Although the islands have no permanent residents, the seven islands that make up the Pacific Remote Islands are stepping stones that connect Hawaii to Micronesia, and other Polynesian sea voyaging cultures. The voyage from Hawaii to neighboring Marshall Islands once included a stop at Johnston Atoll. Wake Atoll is geographically, culturally, and historically linked to the people who live in the Republic of the Marshall Islands. Kingman, Palmyra, Jarvis, Howland, and Baker are connected to the Republic of Kiribati. Voyaging and culture link all of these islands.

Wake has a current transient population of ca. 125 military personnel and contractors. Johnston Atoll had a peak population of 1,100 military and civilian contractor personnel in 2000, but it was evacuated by 2007. From 2010 through 2021, volunteer biologists lived and worked on the island in groups of 5, but since May 2021 the island has had no permanent inhabitants. Four to twenty Nature Conservancy and U.S. Fish and Wildlife staff live at Palmyra Atoll at any one time. The four other islands are usually uninhabited.

Public entry to the islands is by special-use permit from U.S. Fish and Wildlife Service, and is generally restricted to scientists and educators. Only Wake Island and Palmyra Atoll have serviceable runways; Jarvis, Johnston Atoll, Baker, and Howland Islands had airstrips in earlier times but they have long been abandoned and are no longer operational.

See also
List of national monuments of the United States
Howland and Baker Islands, includes coverage of the Howland-Baker Islands EEZ
Marianas Trench Marine National Monument
Rose Atoll Marine National Monument

References

External links

 
Pacific Remote Islands Marine National Monument|, photo gallery by USFWS
 Copy of official map

 
Marine reserves of the United States
Polynesia
Protected areas established in 2009
United States Fish and Wildlife Service
United States Minor Outlying Islands
National monuments in insular areas of the United States
2009 establishments in the United States
2009 establishments in Oceania